Casella is a comune (municipality) in the Metropolitan City of Genoa in the Italian region Liguria, located about  northeast of Genoa.

The municipality of Casella contains the frazioni (subdivisions, mainly villages and hamlets): Carpeneta, Cortino, Crocetta, Parata-Salvega, Stabbio, Stazione.

Casella borders the following municipalities: Montoggio, Savignone, Serra Riccò, Valbrevenna.

Demographic evolution

References

External links 
 www.comune.casella.ge.it/

Cities and towns in Liguria